Jimmy Connors Tennis is a tennis simulation video game developed by NMS Software for the Nintendo Entertainment System and the Game Boy, and published by Ubi Soft in 1993. The game was also developed for the Atari Lynx console by Handmade Software and published by Ubisoft. A Sega Genesis version was planned but never released.

The game features the name and likeness of American world-number-one tennis champion Jimmy Connors. Ubisoft published Jimmy Connors Tennis two years after Connors' late-career comeback in the Men's Singles division at the 1991 US Open, where he reached the semifinals.

Gameplay
The player can compete in an ATP World Tour at one of three difficulty levels, or just practice hitting tennis balls. Two players may play competitively. The Game Boy version of the game allows two-player competitive play over a Game Link Cable.

See also
 Pro Tennis Tour 2 (1991)
 Jimmy Connors Pro Tennis Tour (1989)
 Tennis (1984)
 Top Players' Tennis (1989)
 List of Nintendo Entertainment System games
 Sports game

References

External links
 

1993 video games
Atari Lynx games
Cancelled Sega Genesis games
Cultural depictions of Jimmy Connors
Game Boy games
Hand Made Software games
Multiplayer and single-player video games
Nintendo Entertainment System games
NMS Software games
Tennis video games
Ubisoft games
Video games based on real people
Video games developed in the United Kingdom
Video games scored by Mark Cooksey